The Golden Horse Award for Best Director is given at the Golden Horse Film Awards.

Winners and nominees

References

Awards for best director
Golden Horse Film Awards